Diego José Gómez Heredia (born 12 February 1990), simply known as Diego Gómez, is a Spanish retired footballer who played as a goalkeeper.

Club career
Born in Salamanca, Castile and León, Diego joined FC Barcelona's La Masia in 2002, aged 11, after a stint at rivals Real Madrid. He was released in 2009, and made his senior debuts with CF Olesa de Montserrat in Tercera División.

On 10 December 2009 Diego joined Palamós CF, also in the fourth level. In July 2010 he moved to UDA Gramenet, but spent the vast majority of his spell exclusively the reserves, only appearing on the bench with the main squad on 2 January 2011, in a 1–1 away draw against CD Dénia.

In the summer of 2011, Diego signed for fourth-tier club Terrassa FC, being a regular starter for the side. In August 2013 he moved abroad for the first time in his career, joining Hong Kong Premier League side Southern District RSA.

Diego made his professional debut on 1 September 2012, starting in a 1–3 away loss against Hong Kong Rangers FC. He only appeared in one further match before being released in October.

Diego retired in December 2012, aged only 22, mainly due to injuries.

Post-playing career
After retiring, Diego was a coach in an A.C. Milan youth setup in Hong Kong. In the 2014 summer he was appointed delegate of UE Sant Andreu's Juvenil squad.

References

External links

Diego José Gómez Heredia at HKFA

1990 births
Living people
Sportspeople from Salamanca
Spanish footballers
Footballers from Castile and León
Association football goalkeepers
Tercera División players
Palamós CF footballers
Terrassa FC footballers
Hong Kong First Division League players
Southern District FC players
Spanish expatriate footballers
Spanish expatriate sportspeople in Hong Kong
Expatriate footballers in Hong Kong